Zoe Incrocci (21 September 1917 – 6 November 2003) was an Italian actress and voice actress.

Biography 
Born in Brescia, Incrocci was the older sister of the screenwriter Agenore Incrocci. She made her film debut at young age in a supporting role in the 1934 comedy film L'eredità dello zio buonanima directed by Amleto Palermi.  She worked intensively in theater, radio, television and films. She was also a very active voice actress. In 1991 Incrocci received a David di Donatello for Best Supporting Actress and a Silver Ribbon in the same category thanks to her performance in Francesca Archibugi's Towards Evening.

As a voice actress, Incrocci voiced Grandmother Willow in the Italian-Language dub of Pocahontas. She reprised this role in the sequel.

Personal life
Incrocci was married to the radio director Nino Meloni until his death in 1960.

Death
On 6 November 2003 Incrocci died at her home in Rome at the age of 86. Her brother died just two years later.

Partial filmography

 Everybody's Woman (1934) - La collegiale che fa le imitazioni (uncredited)
 Seconda B (1934) - L'allieva Fumasoni
 L'eredità dello zio buonanima (1934) - Sisina
 Il serpente a sonagli (1935) - Collegiale
 But It's Nothing Serious (1936) - (uncredited)
 The Anonymous Roylott (1936)
 Nina non far la stupida (1937) - Signora curiosa al balcone
 La mazurka di papà (1938)
 Toto Looks for a Wife (1950) - Nannina
 Ring Around the Clock (1950) - Concettina
 Strano appuntamento (1950)
 The Steamship Owner (1951) - Una delle donne furiose
 Perdonami! (1953) - Adele
 Passionate Song (1953) - Prostituta alla Stazione
 Of Life and Love (1954) - Andrea's sister (segment "Marsina Stretta")
 We Stole a Tram (1954)
 Bravissimo (1955) - Margherita
 Destinazione Piovarolo (1955) - Nipote di Ernesto
 Allow Me, Daddy! (1956) - Una cliente del macellaio
 Noi siamo le colonne (1956) - Ida (uncredited)
 Mamma sconosciuta (1956) - Madre superiora (uncredited)
 Rascel-Fifì (1957) - La signora Patrick
 Colpo gobbo all'italiana (1962)
 Dropout (1970)
 The Adventures of Pinocchio (1972, TV Mini-Series) - Lumaca
 High Crime (1973) - Scavino's Wife
 Down and Dirty (1976) - Madre Tommasina
 Towards Evening (1990) - Elvira
 Screw Loose (1999) - Mrs. De Luca
 Si fa presto a dire amore... (2000) - Zia Iole
 La collezione invisibile (2003) - Adua
 Do You Mind If I Kiss Mommy? (2003) - Bettina Patti (final film role)

References

External links 

1917 births
2003 deaths
Actors from Brescia
Italian film actresses
Italian television actresses
Italian voice actresses
Italian stage actresses
Italian radio actresses
20th-century Italian actresses
Nastro d'Argento winners
David di Donatello winners